

References
  ((−)-D-arginine hydrate)
  (for L-arginine)
  (D-arginine)
  (L-arginine)

Chemical data pages
Chemical data pages cleanup